Acrodectes Peak is a mountain peak of the Sierra Nevada, located within Kings Canyon National Park in southern Fresno County, California.

The summit is 13,187 feet (4020 m) in elevation.

The peak was named after Acrodectes philopagus, a rare katydid species found in the region.

See also

References

Mountains of Kings Canyon National Park
Mountains of Fresno County, California
Mountains of Northern California